The Mount Gambier railway line was a railway line on the South Australian Railways network. Opened in stages from 1881, it was built to narrow gauge and joined Mount Gambier railway station, which was at that time the eastern terminus of a line to Beachport. It connected at Naracoorte to another isolated narrow gauge line joining Naracoorte to Kingston SE, and to the broad gauge Adelaide-Wolseley line at Wolseley, at around the same time that was extended to Serviceton to become the South Australian part of the interstate Melbourne–Adelaide railway. Since its closure in 1995 following the standardisation of the interstate main line, there have been varying calls for standardisation of the railway between Wolseley and Heywood.

History

Kingston to Naracoorte

An isolated line was authorised by the South-Eastern Railway Act in 1871 and completed in 1876 from the port at Kingston SE inland via Lucindale to Naracoorte as narrow gauge. For the first six months after the line was completed, no locomotives were available, so wagons on the line were towed by horses. It was converted to broad gauge with a new terminus one kilometre east of Kingston, on the edge of the port township in 1957. It closed on 28 November 1987.

Rivoli Bay to Mount Gambier
Another narrow gauge railway was built from the port on Rivoli Bay at what is now Beachport inland via Millicent to Mount Gambier in 1878. The line and jetty at Beachport provided the ability for farms in the district to export wool and grain. When the line was converted to broad gauge in 1957, it was cut back and no longer served Beachport, but only Mount Gambier to Millicent until it closed in April 1995.

Part of the line was used by the Limestone Coast Railway tourist service, until it ceased on 1 July 2006.

Mount Gambier to Wolseley

The railway connecting Mount Gambier to Naracoorte was initially approved by the Parliament of South Australia in 1867 to be built to  gauge. However it was not built at this time, and that act was repealed by a later authorisation in 1884 to build it on the same alignment to  gauge.

On 21 September 1881, the first section of the line opened from Naracoorte to Tatiara. It was extended north to Wolseley on 18 April 1883 and south from Naracoorte to Mount Gambier on 14 June 1887.

The Mount Gambier line was gauge converted to broad gauge in 1953 being a dual gauge line then with the narrow gauge being completely removed by 1959 . 

Australian National passenger services ceased on 31 December 1990.

When the Melbourne–Adelaide railway was converted to standard gauge, the Mount Gambier to Wolseley line was not converted and was closed  on 12 April 1995. 

In 2001, expressions of interest were sought for a private operator to reopen the line with the state government offering financial assistance to gauge convert, but nothing came of it. If done so it would be the first in Australia to have all 3 gauges. 

Part of the line was used by the Limestone Coast Railway tourist service, until it ceased 1 July 2006. On 13 February 2019 the South Australian Regional Rail Alliance (SARRA)  called on the State Government to standardise the line for freight and possible passenger services but still nothing has come of this either.

Glencoe branch
On 22 August 1904, a 14.2-kilometre narrow gauge branch-line was constructed from Wandilo, 13 kilometres north of Mount Gambier, to Glencoe. The branch closed in June 1957 when the Mount Gambier Wolseley line was all converted to only broad gauge.

Victorian connection

On 28 November 1917, the Victorian Railways opened a broad gauge line from Heywood.  This line was closed on 11 April 1995. Part of this line was used for Limestone Coast Railway tourist services to the border until it ceased 20 March 1999.  The Heywood line was permanently severed from the Wolseley line when the remains of Mount Gambier railway station was made into a public community space in 2015 with a two track easement left for right of way if standardised.

Stations
The stations and sidings included:

References

External links
Gallery

Closed railway lines in South Australia
Limestone Coast
Railway lines opened in 1883
Railway lines closed in 1995
5 ft 3 in gauge railways in Australia
Mount Gambier, South Australia